Three Weeks in Paradise is a video game released in 1986 by Mikro-Gen for the ZX Spectrum and Amstrad CPC platforms. It is the last action-adventure platform in the Wally Week series.

Gameplay
The Weeks family are trapped on a tropical island inhabited by cannibals. Herbert and Wilma (Wally's son and wife) have been captured, and Wally must rescue them and build a raft to escape.

The player only controls Wally and must solve puzzles and avoid obstacles such as animals and natives - especially the tribal chief, who's patrolling the area.  Each puzzle solved builds a piece of escape raft.  As with previous Wally games humour plays an important part in both the gameplay and puzzle solving.

The graphics were detailed and the Spectrum version had an option to switch off Wally's natural colour, which would remove the colour clash. In the ZX Spectrum +128 version there are few additional screens and objects to use, but the rest of the game remains the same.

Development

Reception

Three Weeks in Paradise received positive reception from critics. The ZX Spectrum version was voted number 76 in the Your Sinclair Official Top 100 Games of All Time.

References

External links
 
 

1986 video games
Amstrad CPC games
Mikro-Gen games
Platform games
Single-player video games
Video games developed in the United Kingdom
ZX Spectrum games